The Vice President is a mountain on The President/Vice President Massif just north of Emerald Lake in Yoho National Park, near the Alpine Club of Canada's Stanley Mitchell hut.  The Vice President was named Mount McNicoll in 1904 by Edward Whymper after David McNicoll, the VP of the Canadian Pacific Railway.  In 1907, the mountain was renamed by the Alpine Club of Canada, after it was discovered that the name had already been used on a mountain near Rogers Pass.

Routes
There appears to be only one route up the Vice President—up the President glacier to the col, then up a snow slope to the ridge, then to the peak.

External links
 The Vice President at bivouac.com

Gallery

Canadian Rockies
Three-thousanders of British Columbia
Mountains of Yoho National Park
Kootenay Land District